John Michael Lewis Mousinho (born 30 April 1986) is an English professional football manager and former player, who is the current manager of EFL League One club Portsmouth.

Mousinho began his professional football career at Brentford, having previously played for Chesham United and Notre Dame Fighting Irish, the latter whilst studying at the University of Notre Dame. He spent two-and-a-half years at Brentford, before joining Wycombe Wanderers in June 2008 on a free transfer. Mousinho played regularly for Wycombe for two seasons, experiencing both a promotion and relegation during his time at the Buckinghamshire club.

He signed for Stevenage in June 2010 on a two-year contract. In his first season at Stevenage, Mousinho helped guide the club to the second of back-to-back promotions, scoring the winning goal in the 2010–11 League Two play-off final, as well as finishing as the club's joint top goalscorer for the season. Following an injury-disrupted season during the 2011–12 season, Mousinho left Stevenage and joined Preston North End. In his final season at Preston, he was loaned to Gillingham and back to Stevenage before being released and joining Burton Albion in June 2014. He played regularly for Burton over three seasons, winning the League Two title in his first season and promotion to the Championship a year later. In August 2017, he joined Oxford United, where he finished his playing career. Mousinho was elected as chairman of the PFA in May 2021. He held the role until January 2023, when he left the role to become head coach of Portsmouth.

Early life
Born in Isleworth, Greater London, Mousinho is of Portuguese descent. His father's side of the family originate from Lisbon. He grew up supporting Tottenham Hotspur, and states his footballing heroes were Darren Anderton and Teddy Sheringham after watching the attacking football Tottenham played during the early 1990s.

Career

Brentford
Mousinho was signed by Brentford manager Martin Allen during the 2005–06 season, after returning from the United States where he was studying and playing football at the University of Notre Dame. He was recommended to Brentford by Allen's son, having previously played for Chesham United. He made his Brentford debut on 18 October 2005 in a 1–1 against Oxford United in the Football League Trophy, playing the whole match. Mousinho made his Football League debut for the club two months later in a 4–1 away win over Tranmere Rovers on 17 December 2005, coming on as a 76th-minute substitute.

Mousinho was sent on loan to several non-League clubs – Woking, Slough Town, and Yeading – mid-way through the 2005–06 season. He did not make any first-team appearances for Woking, his loan spell lasting just two weeks. He was loaned to Slough Town upon the conclusion of his agreement with Woking, and made his debut for the club in a 2–1 away win over Fisher Athletic, before scoring his first goal for the club in a 3–2 victory over Bromley; Mousinho's goal came in the 58th minute as Slough came from two goals down to win the match. In April 2006, he was loaned out to Conference South club Yeading, where he played six times, making his debut in the club's 4–0 defeat to Basingstoke Town. Martin Allen stated that Mousinho's loan moves were "positive" and "definitely not the end of his time at Brentford".

On returning to his parent club, Mousinho played more frequently during the 2006–07 season. Initially he acted as cover for regular right-back Kevin O'Connor, but was then played in a central midfield role. He was also the outfield player chosen to play as goalkeeper against Gillingham on 21 October 2006, when Clark Masters was sent off with no substitute goalkeeper available; the game ended 2–2, Mousinho playing 75 minutes in goal. He played 39 times during the season and was subsequently rewarded with an extended contract, which was due to run until June 2009. The following season, he scored his first goal for the club in a 2–1 victory against Barnet on 27 August 2007, scoring the rebound from Kevin O'Connor's missed penalty. He played 24 times in all competitions, 15 times fewer than during the club's previous season. At the end of the 2007–08 season, Mousinho was transfer-listed by manager Andy Scott because he did not feature in the club's future plans and, as a result, his first-team chances would be limited.

Wycombe Wanderers
His contract was terminated by mutual consent with a year to run on 16 June 2008 and he joined Wycombe later that day. On joining Wycombe, Mousinho said "It's been my local club since I was quite young so I've been down here a few times and it was the lure of that, plus the chance to work with Peter Taylor, that made me jump at the chance." He made his debut for Wycombe in the club's opening game of the 2008–09 season, a 1–1 draw against Morecambe on 9 August 2008. He scored his first goal for the club a week later in a 2–0 away victory over Chester City. Wycombe triggered a one-year extension clause in his contract on 7 October 2008, subsequently keeping him at the club until 2010. Mousinho scored his second goal of the season in Wycombe's 3–3 draw against his former employers, Brentford, on 14 March 2009. He played 38 times in all competitions during his first season with the club, scoring twice, as Wycombe earned promotion to League One after finishing in the third and final automatic promotion place.

The following season, he played a further 41 matches, scoring once in a 5–2 home defeat to Brighton & Hove Albion on 28 December 2009, with Wycombe being relegated back to League Two at the end of the season. During his two years at Wycombe, he played 79 times for the club in all competitions, scoring three goals.

Stevenage
At the end of the season, Mousinho rejected a contract extension at Wycombe, which led to Wycombe manager Gary Waddock saying "we wanted to keep John, but he's decided to go elsewhere. It's an open secret where he's going." Two days later, on 28 June 2010, Mousinho joined newly promoted League Two club Stevenage on a two-year deal, officially signing for the club on 1 July 2010. Mousinho made his Stevenage debut in the club's 1–0 defeat to Bradford City in the club's second game of the season on 14 August 2010. He scored his first goal for Stevenage on 9 October 2010, the equaliser in a 1–1 draw with Rotherham United. A month later, Mousinho scored twice in Stevenage's 3–0 victory away at local rivals Barnet. Mousinho was sent off for the first time in his Stevenage career on 30 April 2011, receiving a straight red card in Stevenage's 2–0 defeat at Northampton Town. The red card meant that Mousinho served a three-game suspension. Stevenage appealed against the sending off, but were unsuccessful. He subsequently missed the club's 3–3 draw against Bury on 7 May 2011, and their 3–0 aggregate play-off semi-final victory against Accrington Stanley. Mousinho returned to the first team for the 2010–11 play-off final against Torquay United at Old Trafford on 28 May 2011, a game in which he scored the only goal with a strike from 20 yards in a 1–0 Stevenage victory. During his first season with the club, Mousinho finished as the club's joint top goalscorer with eight goals in 44 appearances.

Mousinho missed the first three games of Stevenage's 2011–12 season because of a calf injury sustained during pre-season. He returned to the first team on 16 August 2011, starting in a 3–1 away victory against AFC Bournemouth, scoring Stevenage's second goal of the game from the penalty spot. Mousinho's second goal of the season came in Stevenage's 5–1 win against Sheffield Wednesday at Broadhall Way, beating defender Rob Jones for pace before driving a shot from 20 yards past goalkeeper Richard O'Donnell. He injured a metatarsal bone in his right foot in Stevenage's 1–0 away victory against Hartlepool United in the FA Cup on 12 November 2011, and was subsequently ruled out of first-team action for six weeks. Mousinho suffered another injury setback in January 2012, when scans revealed further damage to the metatarsal bone. Mousinho returned to the first team on 14 April 2012, coming on as a late substitute in the club's 6–0 away victory at Yeovil Town. He made 23 appearances during an injury-disrupted season, scoring three goals. Three days after their play-off semi-final defeat, on 17 May 2012, Mousinho turned down an improved contract and opted to leave the club after two years.

Preston North End
Mousinho joined League One club Preston North End on a free transfer on 29 May 2012, signing a two-year deal with the club. The move reunited him with former Stevenage manager Graham Westley. He was named as club captain for the 2012–13 season. Mousinho made his Preston debut in the club's opening game of the season on 13 August 2012, playing the whole match as Preston beat Championship team Huddersfield Town 2–0 at Deepdale. He scored his first goal for the club on 1 January 2013, a first-half header and the only goal in a 1–0 away win against Hartlepool United. Mousinho made 29 appearances during the season, scoring once.

Following Westley's sacking from Preston earlier in the year, Mousinho started the 2013–14 season having made just three appearances for the club in the opening three months of the season under new manager Simon Grayson. He was subsequently loaned out to fellow League One club Gillingham on 7 November 2013, on a two-month loan agreement. Mousinho made his Gillingham debut a day after signing, playing in a 1–1 home draw with Brackley Town in the FA Cup. He scored the winning goal for Gillingham against former club Stevenage on 26 November 2013, scoring in the 76th minute of a 3–2 victory. Mousinho suffered a hamstring injury in a 4–1 loss to Rotherham United four days later, and returned to his parent club before the end of the loan agreement. He made six appearances in his one month at Gillingham.

After recovering from his injury, Mousinho rejoined Stevenage on loan for the remainder of the season on 31 January 2014. The move meant that Mousinho had been signed by manager Graham Westley for a third time. He made his second debut for the club against Gillingham, the club he had been on loan at earlier in the season, as Stevenage won the match 3–1 at Broadhall Way. He scored once during the loan spell, in a 3–1 win over Tranmere Rovers on 8 March 2014. Mousinho made 16 appearances during the four-month agreement as Stevenage were relegated back to League Two. Mousinho was one of six players released by Preston on 20 May 2014.

Burton Albion
Following his release from Preston, Mousinho joined League Two club Burton Albion on a two-year deal on 6 June 2014. Manager Gary Rowett revealed that Mousinho had been the club's primary transfer target that summer. He made his Burton debut in the club's first match of the 2014–15 season, a 1–0 away victory against Oxford United. Mousinho scored his first goal for Burton in his fifth appearance, a second-half equaliser away at Newport County on 23 August 2014. He was appointed the club's captain during his first season with Burton, making 45 appearances throughout the season as the club earned promotion to League One after finishing the season as League Two champions.

Mousinho's contract at Burton was extended by a further year on 15 October 2015. He was almost ever-present for the club during the 2015–16 season, making 48 appearances. Burton finished the season as runners-up in League One, meaning Mousinho had helped the club earn back-to-back promotions in his two seasons there. He made 32 appearances during the 2016–17 season as Burton remained in the Championship courtesy of a 20th-place finish. Mousinho stated the muted celebrations despite the club's survival showed how far the club had come in recent seasons. Mousinho did, however, go on to state "in some ways it is more of an achievement than getting promoted, it is more of a stiff task to stay in the Championship than to get out of League One perhaps. It was a different feeling and one which will take a bit of time to sink in." During his three years at the club, Mousinho made 127 appearances and captained the club to consecutive promotions from League Two to the Championship.

Oxford United
Despite starting in Burton's first two matches of the 2017–18 season, Mousinho did not play again for the remainder of the month. He subsequently left Burton by mutual consent on 31 August 2017, signing a two-year deal with Oxford United on the same day. Burton manager Nigel Clough stated he had advised Mousinho "that if he had the opportunity to get a longer contract with a club which was also further south and that was the best thing for him then we wouldn't stand in his way. He has been a magnificent player for the club. It will be sad to lose him. He made his Oxford United debut in a 3–0 home victory over Gillingham on 9 September 2017. Following an injury to team-mate Curtis Nelson, Mousinho was appointed club captain on 17 November 2017. He scored his first goal for the Oxford in the club's final home game of the season, scoring a penalty kick to restore parity in an eventual 2–1 win against Rochdale on 28 April 2018. He made 44 appearances during his first season with the club. Mousinho made 43 appearances during the 2018–19 season, scoring twice, as Oxford remained in League One following a 12th-place finish.

Mousinho made 33 appearances for Oxford during the 2019–20 season, before the regular season was curtailed because of the COVID-19 pandemic in March 2020. He signed a new one-year contract on 30 June 2020, which enabled him to play in Oxford's League One play-off matches, the club having finished in fourth place, determined on an unweighted points-per-game basis. He made one appearance in the play-offs, as Oxford were defeated by Wycombe Wanderers in the 2020 EFL League One play-off Final on 13 July 2020. Having managed "a longstanding knee problem", Mousinho suffered a knee injury in an EFL Cup match against Watford in the opening month of the 2020–21 season. The injury ultimately ruled him out for six weeks, during which he was a part of Oxford manager Karl Robinson's first-team coaching staff. He suffered a recurrence of the knee injury in Oxford's 4–0 home victory against Northampton Town on 15 December 2020 and underwent surgery in January 2021, which meant he missed the remainder of the 2020–21 season. Having returned to pre-season training at Oxford, Mousinho signed a new two-year contract on 5 July 2021, taking on a player-coach role.

Managerial career

Portsmouth
On 20 January 2023, Mousinho was announced as head coach of League One club Portsmouth. Mousinho won his first two games in charge, marking both Portsmouth's first win since November, and their first home win since September. Mousinho then went on to lead Portsmouth to their largest win of the season, a 4–0 victory against Cheltenham Town, marking four wins in his first eight games in charge.

Style of play
Mousinho spent the first decade of his senior career being deployed as a central midfielder. He also provided cover at right-back during his time at Brentford. He made the transition from central midfield to centre-back during his time at Burton Albion and spent the 2016–17 season playing in both roles. His leadership skills have been highlighted, with Mousinho named club captain at Burton and Oxford.

Chairmanship of PFA
Mousinho was elected as chairman of the newly formed Professional Footballers' Association (PFA) players' board in May 2021. He had previously served as a member of the PFA management committee who had overseen a restructure of the organisation.

Personal life
He plays the guitar, and mostly likes listening to indie music.

Career statistics

A.  The "Other" column constitutes appearances and goals (including those as a substitute) in the Football League Trophy and play-offs.

Managerial statistics

Honours
Stevenage
 League Two play-offs: 2010–11

Burton Albion
 League Two: 2014–15

References

External links

1986 births
Footballers from Isleworth
Living people
Association football midfielders
English footballers
Notre Dame Fighting Irish men's soccer players
Brentford F.C. players
Woking F.C. players
Slough Town F.C. players
Yeading F.C. players
Wycombe Wanderers F.C. players
Stevenage F.C. players
Preston North End F.C. players
Burton Albion F.C. players
Oxford United F.C. players
English Football League players
People educated at Dr Challoner's Grammar School
University of Notre Dame alumni
English people of Portuguese descent
Association football coaches
Portsmouth F.C. managers
English Football League managers
Oxford United F.C. non-playing staff